Hutton station is on the Canadian National Railway mainline in Hutton, British Columbia. Via Rail's Jasper – Prince Rupert train calls at the station as a flag stop.

The station was built in 1914 by Grand Trunk Pacific Railway, originally as Hutton Mills, the town include a saw mill that manufactured ties for railway.

References

External links 
Via Rail Station Description

Via Rail stations in British Columbia
Railway stations in Canada opened in 1914